The following is a list of notable deaths in July 2020.

Entries for each day are listed alphabetically by surname. A typical entry lists information in the following sequence:
 Name, age, country of citizenship at birth, subsequent country of citizenship (if applicable), reason for notability, cause of death (if known), and reference.

July 2020

1
Kwadwo Owusu Afriyie, 62–63, Ghanaian politician, CEO of the Forestry Commission (since 2017), COVID-19.
Bill Black, 76, New Zealand pilot and deer hunter.
Pierre Breteche, 91, French Olympic sailor (1968).
Edward A. Burkhalter, 91, American navy officer, heart attack.
Jean Cabannes, 95, French magistrate and jurist, member of the Constitutional Council (1989–1998).
Cao Zhi, 92, Chinese politician, Vice Chairman of the National People's Congress (1998–2003).
Gyan Kumari Chhantyal, 63, Nepali politician, member of the Constituent Assembly (since 2013), heart disease.
Nancie Colling, 101, English lawn bowls player.
Max Crook, 83, American keyboardist and songwriter ("Runaway").
Gay Culverhouse, 73, American academic administrator and sports executive, President of the Tampa Bay Buccaneers (1991–1994) and Notre Dame College (1995–1996), myelofibrosis.
Hugh Downs, 99, American broadcaster and television host (20/20, Today, Concentration), heart failure.
Luizinho Drummond, 80, Brazilian illegal lottery operator, stroke.
Bill Duplissea, 70, American politician, member of the California State Assembly (1986–1988), cancer.
Heinrich Fink, 85, German theologian and politician.
David F. Gantt, 78, American politician, member of the New York State Assembly (since 1983).
Beate Grimsrud, 57, Norwegian novelist and playwright, breast cancer.
Ida Haendel, 91, Polish-born British violinist, kidney cancer.
George Hallett, 78, South African photographer.
Matthias Kaul, 71, German percussionist and composer.
Ian MacDougall, 82, Australian naval officer, Chief of the Naval Staff (1991–1994).
Brent MacNab, 89, Canadian ice hockey player.
Lorenz Magaard, 86, German-American mathematician and oceanographer.
Santiago Manuin Valera, 63, Peruvian Awajún leader and Indigenous rights activist, COVID-19.
Ray Matheny, 91, American anthropologist.
Eurídice Moreira, 81, Brazilian politician, Paraíba MLA (1995–1998), complications from COVID-19.
Jean-Pierre Moumon, 72–73, French writer.
Joe Pennington, 92, American musician.
Latifur Rahman, 75, Bangladeshi comprador (Transcom Group).
Emmanuel Rakotovahiny, 81, Malagasy politician, Prime Minister (1995–1996), heart disease.
Georg Ratzinger, 96, German Roman Catholic priest and musician, conductor of the Regensburger Domspatzen (1964–1994).
Tommy Ring, 81, Irish hurler.
Rokamlova, 79, Indian politician, Speaker of the Mizoram Legislative Assembly (1990–1993), kidney disease.
Pedro Luis Ronchino, 92, Argentine Roman Catholic prelate, Bishop of Comodoro Rivadavia (1993–2005).
Paul Seban, 90, Algerian-born French film director (La Musica, French Cancan).
Jan Steward, 91, American photographer, complications from pneumonia.
Jim Thorpe, 76, American Canadian football player (Winnipeg Blue Bombers, Toronto Argonauts).
Aleksejs Vidavskis, 76, Latvian politician, mayor of Daugavpils (1994–2001).
Sir Everton Weekes, 95, Barbadian cricketer (West Indies, national team).
Sybil Wettasinghe, 92, Sri Lankan children's author.

2
Ira Albright, 61, American football player (Montreal Alouettes, Buffalo Bills).
Betsy Ancker-Johnson, 93, American plasma physicist.
Olga Blinova, 89, Russian linguist.
Paolo Cabras, 89, Italian politician, Deputy (1972–1987), Senator (1987–1994).
Raymond Carter, 84, British politician, MP (1970–1979).
Chiu Chuang-huan, 94, Taiwanese politician, President of the Examination Yuan (1993–1996), Vice Premier (1981–1984) and Minister of Interior (1978–1981), complications from pneumonia.
Fan Yunruo, 24, Chinese professional Go player, suicide by jumping.
Christian Garrison, 78, American author and filmmaker, cancer.
Afroditi Grigoriadou, 88, Greek actress (Electra, I Agapi Argise mia Mera).
Jon Gilliam, 81, American football player (Dallas Texans, Kansas City Chiefs).
Jack Harding, 87, Irish hurler.
Ludwig Hinterstocker, 89, German footballer (VfB Stuttgart).
Ole Holsti, 86, American political scientist.
Ángela Jeria, 93, Chilean archaeologist and human rights activist.
Nikolai Kapustin, 82, Russian composer and pianist.
Jiro Kuwata, 85, Japanese manga artist (8 Man).
Tunney Lee, 88, Chinese-born American architect, complications from cancer.
Wanderley Mariz, 79, Brazilian politician, Deputy (1975–1987), complications from COVID-19.
Bill Massey, 83, New Zealand Hall of Fame softball player (national team), World Championship bronze medallist (1966).
Teodoro Enrique Pino Miranda, 73, Mexican Roman Catholic prelate, Bishop of Huajuapan de León (since 2000).
Joseph Moroni, 82, French Olympic rower.
John Ebong Ngole, 80, Cameroonian politician.
Tilo Prückner, 79, German actor (The NeverEnding Story, Iron Sky, Tatort), heart failure.
Kevin Rafferty, 73, American film director (The Atomic Cafe, Blood in the Face) and cinematographer (Roger & Me), cancer.
Avon Riley, 62, American football player (Houston Oilers, Pittsburgh Steelers).
Reckful, 31, Israeli-American Twitch streamer, suicide.
Abraham Louis Schneiders, 94, Dutch diplomat and writer.
Ronald L. Schwary, 76, American film and television producer (Ordinary People, Batteries Not Included, Medium), Oscar winner (1981).
Billy Tang, 69, Hong Kong film director (Dr. Lamb, Those Were the Days..., Dial D for Demons), nasopharyngeal carcinoma.
Marc Treanor, 57, British sand artist.
Mike Walling, 69, English comic actor and screenwriter.
Xu Qifeng, 84, Chinese engineer.
Yoon Sam-yook, 83, South Korean film director (I Will Survive) and screenwriter (Yalkae, a Joker in High School, Suddenly at Midnight).
Willem van Zwet, 86, Dutch mathematician.

3
Ejike Obumneme Aghanya, 87, Nigerian military officer and electrical engineer.
Manuel Machado Alvarez, 59, Cuban murderer, COVID-19.
Protik Prakash Banerjee, 51, Indian jurist, Judge of the Calcutta High Court (since 2017), heart failure.
Tyson Brummett, 35, American baseball player (Philadelphia Phillies), plane crash.
Neil Erland Byers, 91, Canadian politician.
Earl Cameron, 102, Bermudian-born British actor (Doctor Who, Pool of London, The Interpreter).
Hermine de Clermont-Tonnerre, 54, French princess, writer and actress (La Ferme Célébrités), traffic collision.
Len Cunning, 69, Canadian ice hockey player (Johnstown Jets).
Scott Erskine, 57, American serial killer, COVID-19.
Bob Gleeson, 88, Australian footballer (Richmond).
Wahidul Haq, 87, Bangladeshi politician, Minister of Finance (1988, 1988–1990).
Saroj Khan, 71, Indian choreographer (Mr. India, Nagina, Chandni), cardiac arrest.
Lore Krainer, 89, Austrian composer.
Ardico Magnini, 91, Italian footballer (Pistoiese, Fiorentina, national team).
Willie McGrotty, 67, Scottish footballer (Blackpool).
Claude Mercier-Ythier, 88–89, French harpsichord maker.
Michel Meylan, 81, French politician, Member of the National Assembly (1988–2002).
Aurelio Moyano, 81, Argentine footballer (FC Nancy, AS Cannes).
Rolf Muuss, 95, German-born American psychologist, heart failure.
Francis Nadeem, 64, Pakistani Roman Catholic priest, heart attack.
Mamadou Bamba Ndiaye, 71, Senegalese politician, Minister of Religious Affairs (2000–2012).
Elba Perez-Cinciarelli, 76, American politician, member of the New Jersey General Assembly (2002–2004).
John Peter, 81, Hungarian-born British theatre critic.
Faruk Quazi, 71, Bangladeshi journalist, kidney failure.
Pamela Rush, 49, American anti-poverty activist, COVID-19.
Charlie Slack, 89, American basketball player (Marshall Thundering Herd).
Bill Stricker, 72, American basketball player (Portland Trail Blazers).
Leonardo Villar, 96, Brazilian actor (O Pagador de Promessas, The Hour and Turn of Augusto Matraga, Juego peligroso), cardiac arrest.
Emily Howell Warner, 80, American airline pilot.

4
Barbara Ackermann, 95, American politician.
T. M. Giasuddin Ahmed, 83, Bangladeshi politician, MP (1986–1990).
Alan S. Becker, 74, American politician, attorney and educator, member of the Florida House of Representatives (1972–1978), cancer.
Angelo Fagiani, 77, Italian Roman Catholic prelate, Archbishop of Camerino-San Severino Marche (1997–2007).
Ronnie and Donnie Galyon, 68, American sideshow attractions and documentary subjects, world's oldest conjoined twins.
Brandis Kemp, 76, American actress (Fridays, AfterMASH, Hexed), brain cancer and complications from COVID-19.
Robert Mack, 61, Austrian Olympic ice hockey player (1988).
Irwin Molasky, 93, American real estate developer.
John Papworth, 98, British Anglican clergyman and activist.
Martha Rocha, 83, Brazilian model, Miss Universo Brasil (1954), heart attack.
Seninho, 71, Portuguese footballer (Porto, New York Cosmos, national team).
Bhakti Charu Swami, 74, Indian spiritual teacher (International Society for Krishna Consciousness), COVID-19.
Earl Thomas, 71, American football player (Chicago Bears, St. Louis Cardinals, Houston Oilers).
Mary Twala, 80, South African actress (Life, Above All, Beat the Drum, Sarafina!).
Arie van der Vlis, 79, Dutch military officer, Chief of the Defence Staff (1992–1994).
Kevin Wickham, 80, Australian Olympic rower (1964).

5
Ragaa Al Geddawy, 85, Egyptian actress and model, COVID-19.
Souzána Antonakáki, 84–85, Greek architect.
Bill Barlow, 89, Canadian politician.
Horace Barlow, 98, British neuroscientist.
Fiorenza Bassoli, 71, Italian politician.
Léo Bergoffen, 97, German-born French Holocaust survivor.
Nirmalendu Bhattacharya, 61, Indian politician.
Antônio Bivar, 81, Brazilian writer and playwright, complications from COVID-19.
Tom Churchill, 59, American meteorologist and radio personality, melanoma.
Mário Coelho, 84, Portuguese bullfighter, COVID-19.
Nick Cordero, 41, Canadian actor and singer (Bullets Over Broadway, A Bronx Tale, Waitress), complications from COVID-19.
Ayatullah Durrani, 64, Pakistani politician, MP (2008–2013), COVID-19.
Cleveland Eaton, 80, American jazz bassist.
Marc A. Franklin, 88, American lawyer.
Bettina Gilois, 58, German-born American screenwriter (Bessie, Glory Road, McFarland, USA), cancer.
Richard C. Henry, 94, American lieutenant general.
Willi Holdorf, 80, German athlete, Olympic champion (1964).
Kōshū Itabashi, 93, Japanese Sōtō Zen master, abbot of Sōji-ji (1998–2002).
Ahmad Karami, 76, Lebanese politician.
Mauro Mellini, 93, Italian lawyer and politician, Deputy (1976–1992), secretary of the Radical Party (1968–1969).
Aubert Pallascio, 82, Canadian actor (The Kidnapping of the President, Black List, Punisher: War Zone), cancer.
Barrie Penrose, 78, British investigative journalist and author, complications from Parkinson's disease.
Brad Pye Jr., 89, American sports journalist (Los Angeles Sentinel), broadcaster, and politician.
Bob Reade, 87, American college football player (Cornell College) and coach (Geneseo High School, Augustana College).
Ena Thomas, 85, Welsh television cook.
Tiloun, 53, Réunionese singer.
Volodymyr Troshkin, 72, Ukrainian football player (Dynamo Kyiv), Olympic bronze medallist (1976) and manager (Veres Rivne).
Olena Tsvek, 88, Ukrainian archaeologist.
Tom Vaughn, 77, American football player (Detroit Lions, Iowa State Cyclones).
Ashoka Wadigamangawa, 68, Sri Lankan politician, MP (1989–1994), traffic collision.
Mahendra Yadav, 70, Indian politician, Delhi MLA (1998–2003) and convicted criminal, COVID-19.

6
Inuwa Abdulkadir, 54, Nigerian politician, complications from COVID-19.
Suresh Amonkar, 68, Indian politician, Goa MLA (2012–2017), COVID-19.
Rosario Bléfari, 54, Argentine actress (Poor Butterfly, I, the Worst of All, Rapado), singer and writer, cancer.
Louis Colavecchio, 78, American counterfeiter.
Carme Contreras i Verdiales, 87, Spanish actress (El cor de la ciutat).
Charlie Daniels, 83, American Hall of Fame country singer-songwriter and musician ("The Devil Went Down to Georgia", "Uneasy Rider"), Grammy winner (1980), hemorrhagic stroke.
Bishnu Charan Das, 65, Indian politician, MP (2016–2017), stroke.
Katie G. Dorsett, 87, American politician, member of the North Carolina Senate (2003–2011).
Esparbec, 79–80, French pornographic author.
Ronald Graham, 84, American mathematician (Graham's number), President of the American Mathematical Society (1993–1994), bronchiectasis.
Hisham al-Hashimi, 47, Iraqi historian and security expert, shot.
Julio Jiménez, 55, Bolivian politician, Deputy (since 2015), COVID-19.
Gordon Kegakilwe, 53, South African politician, North West MEC (since 2019), COVID-19.
Andrew Kishore, 64, Bangladeshi playback singer, non-Hodgkin's lymphoma.
Juris Kronbergs, 73, Latvian-Swedish poet and translator.
Mary Kay Letourneau, 58, American teacher and convicted rapist, cancer.
Steve Madge, 72, English birder and author.
Ennio Morricone, 91, Italian film composer (The Good, the Bad and the Ugly, Once Upon a Time in the West, The Hateful Eight), Oscar winner (2016), complications from a fall.
Zithulele Patrick Mvemve, 79, South African Roman Catholic prelate, Auxiliary Bishop of Johannesburg (1986–1994) and Bishop of Klerksdorp (1994–2013).
Zdzisław Myrda, 69, Polish Olympic basketball player (1980).
Mark Naley, 59, Australian footballer (South Adelaide, Carlton), brain cancer.
Joe Porcaro, 90, American percussionist (The Wrecking Crew).
Giuseppe Rizza, 33, Italian footballer (Juve Stabia, Arezzo, Pergocrema), complications from ruptured brain aneurysm.
Song Jinsheng, 87, Chinese politician, Vice-Chairman of the Peasants' and Workers' Democratic Party (1992–2007).
Osvaldo Sosa, 72, Argentine football player (Club Almagro, Argentinos Juniors) and manager (Talleres de Córdoba), complications from a stroke.
Zoran Stojković, 73, Serbian politician, Minister of Justice (2004–2007).
Ernst Zacharias, 96, German electronic musician and engineer.
Sergey Zagraevsky, 55, Russian-Israeli painter, architectural historian and theologian, heart failure.
Deborah Zamble, 48, Canadian chemist, brain hemorrhage.

7
Hernán Alemán, 65, Venezuelan exiled politician, Deputy (since 2011) and mayor of Cabimas (1989–1996, 2000–2008), complications from COVID-19.
Jale Aylanç, 72, Turkish actress (Suskunlar).
George Boyd, 68, Canadian playwright and news anchor (CBC Newsworld).
Dannes Coronel, 47, Ecuadorian footballer (El Nacional, Macará, national team), heart attack.
Gilbert Doucet, 64, French rugby union player and coach (FC Lourdes, RC Toulonnais).
Millicent S. Ficken, 86, American ethologist.
Elizabeth Harrower, 92, Australian novelist (Down in the City, The Watch Tower, In Certain Circles).
Bob Hitchens, 68, American football player and coach (Miami RedHawks).
Khalid bin Saud Al Saud, 95, Saudi prince.
Henry Krtschil, 87, German composer and pianist.
Yves Lever, 78, Canadian film historian and academic.
Bill Ramsey, 76, English rugby league player (Leeds, Hull, Hunslet).
Juan Rosai, 79, Italian-born American pathologist.
Mike Ryan, 78, American baseball player (Boston Red Sox, Philadelphia Phillies).
Jay Severin, 69, American radio talk show host (WOR, WTKK, Blaze Media) and political consultant, stroke.
R. Sundarrajan, Indian politician, Tamil Nadu MLA.
Henk Tennekes, 69, Dutch toxicologist, active euthanasia for pulmonary disease.
P. D. G. Thomas, 90, Welsh historian.
Chynybaĭ Tursunbekov, 59, Kyrgyz politician, President of the Supreme Council (2016–2017), pneumonia.
Wolfgard Voß, 94, German Olympic gymnast (1952).
Wang Jiafan, 81, Chinese historian.
Dhansiri Weerasinghe, 84, Sri Lankan cricketer (national team).
Wally Wolf, 78, American baseball player (California Angels).

8
Jean-Claude Alibert, 71, French rally racer.
Norman Allinger, 92, American chemist.
Daniel Alvarado, 70, Venezuelan actor (La revancha, Pecado de amor, My Sweet Fat Valentina), fall.
F. G. Bailey, 96, British social anthropologist.
Amadou Gon Coulibaly, 61, Ivorian politician, Prime Minister (since 2017).
Jagdeep, 81, Indian actor (Sholay, Purana Mandir, Andaz Apna Apna) and comedian.
Finn Christian Jagge, 54, Norwegian alpine skier, Olympic champion (1992), gastric volvulus.
Jimmy Johnson, 80, Nigerian actor (The Village Headmaster), surgery complications.
Liliane Klein-Lieber, 96, French resistance member (Eclaireuses et Eclaireurs israélites de France).
E. Walter Miles, 86, American political scientist and legal scholar.
Wayne Mixson, 98, American politician, Governor of Florida (1987), member of the Florida House of Representatives (1967–1978).
Eldon A. Money, 89, American politician, member of the Utah House of Representatives (1974–1979) and Senate (1980–1997).
Ricardo Mthembu, 50, South African politician, mayor of KwaDukuza (2011–2019), COVID-19.
Santiago Nsobeya, 70, Equatoguinean politician, Minister of Foreign Affairs (1999–2003).
Munah Pelham-Youngblood, 36, Liberian politician, member of the House of Representatives (since 2011).
José Antonio Pérez Sánchez, 72, Mexican Roman Catholic prelate, Bishop of the Territorial Prelature of Jesús María del Nayar (1992–2010).
Ross Pritchard, 95, American academic administrator, Chancellor of the University of Denver (1978–1984).
Alex Pullin, 32, Australian Olympic snowboarder (2010, 2014, 2018), snowboard cross world champion (2011, 2013), drowned.
Naya Rivera, 33, American actress (Glee, The Royal Family, Step Up), model and singer, drowned.
Noloyiso Sandile, 56, South African royal, Regent of the Royal House of the AmaRharhabe, COVID-19.
Howard Schoenfield, 62, American tennis player, complications from COVID-19.
Lyudmila Stanukinas, 89, Kazakhstani documentary filmmaker.
Abdelmajid Tlemçani, 82, Tunisian footballer (Espérance Sportive de Tunis, national team).
Brad Watson, 64, American author and academic, heart failure.
William Wolff, 93, German-British journalist and rabbi.
Flossie Wong-Staal, 72, Chinese-American virologist, pneumonia.
Jelko Yuresha, 83, Croatian-born British ballet dancer and choreographer.

9
Johnny Beattie, 93, Scottish actor (River City) and comedian (Scotch & Wry, Rab C. Nesbitt).
Maurice Born, 76–77, Swiss architect and sociologist.
Roland Desné, 89, French philosopher and writer.
Ken Felton, 71, English footballer (Darlington).
Franz Frauneder, 92, Austrian Olympic rower (1948).
Jean-François Garreaud, 74, French actor (Violette Nozière, A Simple Story, I as in Icarus).
Ranjon Ghoshal, 65, Indian theatre director and musician (Moheener Ghoraguli).
Sahara Khatun, 77, Bangladeshi politician, Minister of Home Affairs (2009–2012) and Posts and Telecommunications (2012–2013), MP (since 2009).
Mohamed Kouradji, 68, Algerian football referee, COVID-19.
Antonio Krastev, 59, Bulgarian weightlifter, world champion (1985, 1986), traffic collision.
Cam Millar, 92, Canadian athlete.
Sylvia Martínez Elizondo, 72, Mexican politician, Senator (2016–2018).
Bruce Nestande, 82, American politician, heart attack.
Park Won-soon, 64, South Korean politician, mayor of Seoul (since 2011), suicide.
Hafiz Rahim, 36, Singaporean footballer (Geylang United, Gombak United, national team), traffic collision.
Bob Sabourin, 87, Canadian ice hockey player (Toronto Maple Leafs).
Vladimir Salkov, 83, Russian football player and manager (Shakhtar Donetsk, Rotor Volgograd).
Tong Binggang, 92, Chinese physicist.
Gabriella Tucci, 90, Italian operatic soprano.
Elizabeth Vallance, 75, British philosopher.
Joseph Vidal, 87, French politician, National Assembly member for Aude (1978–1993).

10
Ben Acton, 92, Australian Olympic ice hockey player (1960).
Morris Cerullo, 88, American Pentecostal televangelist, founder of The Inspiration Network, pneumonia.
Ananda Mohan Chakrabarty, 82, Indian-American microbiologist (Diamond v. Chakrabarty).
Jack Charlton, 85, English football player (Leeds United, national team) and manager (Republic of Ireland national team), world champion (1966), lymphoma and dementia.
Robert Curtis Clark, 83, Canadian politician, Alberta MLA (1960–1981).
Johnny Cusack, 92, Irish Gaelic footballer (Cavan, Lavey).
Corra Dirksen, 82, South African rugby player (Northern Transvaal, national team), complications from COVID-19.
Vikas Dubey, 56, Indian gangster and convicted murderer, shot.
Eddie Gale, 78, American jazz trumpeter.
Andrés Indriðason, 78, Icelandic television producer.
Miloš Jakeš, 97, Czech politician, First Secretary of the Communist Party (1987–1989).
Wolfgang Jerat, 65, German football player and coach.
Ghaida Kambash, 46, Iraqi politician (Council of Representatives of Iraq), COVID-19.
Ferenc Koncz, 60, Hungarian politician, MP (1998–2002, 2004–2006, 2010–2014, since 2018), traffic collision.
Cosmas Magaya, 66, Zimbabwean mbira musician, COVID-19.
Panagiotis Manias, 87, Greek basketball player, drowned.
Colin Milner Smith, 83, British judge and cricketer.
Pep Mòdol, 62, Spanish politician and writer, Deputy (1989–1993) and Senator (1996–2000), cancer.
Paik Sun-yup, 99, South Korean military officer.
Dick Passwater, 93, American racecar driver.
Mahmoud Reda, 90, Egyptian dancer, choreographer and Olympic gymnast (1952).
Michael M. Richter, 82, German mathematician and computer scientist.
*Lara van Ruijven, 27, Dutch short track speed skater, Olympic bronze medallist (2018) and world champion (2019), autoimmune disease.
Alfredo Sirkis, 69, Brazilian politician, Deputy (2011–2014), traffic collision.
Steve Sutherland, British club and radio disc jockey (Choice FM, Galaxy FM).
Olga Tass, 91, Hungarian gymnast, Olympic champion (1956).
Genevieve Westcott, 65, Canadian-born New Zealand journalist and television presenter, breast cancer.
Ed Wild, 85, Canadian Olympic basketball player (1956).
Dick Williams, 92, American magician.

11
Marc Angelucci, 52, American attorney and men's rights activist, shot.
Jyotsna Bhatt, 80, Indian ceramicist and potter.
Frank Bolling, 88, American baseball player (Detroit Tigers, Milwaukee/Atlanta Braves).
Al Gagne, 78, American curler, world champion (1965).
Robert Gnaizda, 83, American civil rights lawyer.
Kyaw Hein, 72, Burmese actor (Kanyar Pyo Nae Zayar Ao, Sone Yay, Wai Lae Mhway Kyway Lae Mhway), complications from a stroke.
A. H. Jami, 77, Indian cartoonist.
Patti Karr, 88, American actress.
Edward Kmiec, 84, American Roman Catholic prelate, Bishop of Nashville (1992–2004) and Buffalo (2004–2012).
Nicholas Lash, 86, English theologian.
Lim Boo Liat, 93, Malaysian zoologist.
Florence Littauer, 92, American self-help author.
Jacques Mazoin, 91, French rugby union player and coach (US Dax, Paris UC).
Mary Miller, 90, English actress (Crown Court, EastEnders).
Rich Priske, 52, Canadian bassist, heart attack.
Tõnu Puu, 83, Estonian-born Swedish economist.
Maynard Reece, 100, American wildlife artist.
Engel Reinhoudt, 74, Dutch troubadour and dialect writer.
Sergey Smiryagin, 56, Russian Olympic swimmer (1980).
Donald Whiston, 93, American ice hockey player, Olympic silver medallist (1952).
J. R. Williamson, 77, American football player (Oakland Raiders, Boston Patriots).

12
Jack Ah Kit, 69, Australian politician, Northern Territory MLA (1995–2005).
Miryana Basheva, 73, Bulgarian poet.
Doris Beck, 91, American politician.
Rod Bernard, 79, American singer ("This Should Go On Forever").
Raymundo Capetillo, 76, Mexican actor (Rosa salvaje, Corazón salvaje), COVID-19.
Divya Chouksey, 29, Indian actress and singer, cancer.
Joanna Cole, 75, American children's writer (The Magic School Bus), pulmonary fibrosis.
Alain Desvergnes, 88, French photographer.
Kevin Dwyer, 91, New Zealand cricketer (Auckland).
Judy Dyble, 71, English singer-songwriter (Fairport Convention, Trader Horne), lung cancer.
Hassan Abshir Farah, 75, Somali politician, Prime Minister (2001–2003) and MP (since 2012).
Bill Gilbreth, 72, American baseball player (Detroit Tigers, California Angels), complications from heart surgery.
Mohamed Abdi Hashi, Somali politician, President of Puntland (2004–2005).
Jane Campbell Hutchison, 87, American art historian.
Huey Johnson, 87, American environmentalist.
Ignat Kaneff, 93, Bulgarian-Canadian construction executive and philanthropist.
Nelson Meurer, 77, Brazilian politician, Deputy (1995–2019), mayor of Francisco Beltrão (1989–1993), COVID-19.
Gerard Collier, 5th Baron Monkswell, 73, British hereditary peer.
Manuel Moroun, 93, American transportation executive, heart failure.
Alfred Mtsi, 69, South African politician, mayor of Buffalo City (2015–2016), COVID-19.
Frank Popper, 102, Czech-born French-British art and technology historian.
Kelly Preston, 57, American actress (Jerry Maguire, Twins, Sky High), breast cancer.
Henrik Ripa, 52, Swedish politician, MP (2010–2014).
Nagindas Sanghavi, 100, Indian political columnist.
Jarno Sarkula, 47, Finnish musician (Alamaailman Vasarat).
Eleanor Sokoloff, 106, American pianist.
Wim Suurbier, 75, Dutch football player (Ajax, national team) and manager (Tampa Bay Rowdies), cerebral hemorrhage.
Lajos Szűcs, 76, Hungarian footballer (Ferencvárosi, Budapest Honvéd, national team), Olympic champion (1968).

13
Hasan al-Lawzi, 68, Yemeni writer and politician, Acting Prime Minister (2011), COVID-19.
Luis Arias Graziani, 94, Peruvian air force officer and politician, Minister of Defence (1978–1980) and Chief of the Joint Command (1979), COVID-19.
Nurul Islam Babul, 74, Bangladeshi business magnate, chairman of Jamuna Group, COVID-19.
Christian Biet, 68, French writer and professor.
Ian Black, 76, Australian politician.
Eugene Chelyshev, 98, Russian Indologist.
Kenneth Church, 90, American jockey, pneumonia and COVID-19.
Barrie Cook, 91, British abstract artist.
Moses Costa, 69, Bangladeshi Roman Catholic prelate, Archbishop of Chittagong (since 2017), stroke.
Bernard Cottret, 69, French historian and literary scholar.
Hadi Dahane, 76, Moroccan footballer (Union Sidi Kacem, national team).
Sergio González, 59, Argentine footballer (Instituto).
Marilyn Howard, 81, American politician.
Chuck Hulse, 92, American Hall of Fame racing driver.
Grant Imahara, 49, American electrical engineer (Star Wars, The Matrix) and television personality (MythBusters), brain aneurysm.
Gerardo Juraci Campelo Leite, 88, Brazilian politician, Piauí MLA (1983–1991, 1995–2015), complications from COVID-19.
Delphine Levy, 51, French museum director (Paris Musées).
Camilo Lorenzo Iglesias, 79, Spanish Roman Catholic prelate, Bishop of Astorga (1995–2015).
Zindzi Mandela, 59, South African politician and diplomat.
Daniel David Moses, 68, Canadian poet and playwright.
Pat Quinn, 84, Scottish football player (Motherwell, national team) and manager (East Fife).
Debendra Nath Roy, 64–65, Indian politician, West Bengal MLA (since 2016), hanging.
Borghild Røyseland, 93, Norwegian politician, MP (1985–1993).
Fahim Saleh, 33, Bangladeshi-American web developer and entrepreneur, stabbed.
Zeng Yi, 91, Chinese virologist.

14
Adalet Ağaoğlu, 90, Turkish novelist and playwright, multiple organ failure.
Tolulope Arotile, 24, Nigerian helicopter pilot, traffic collision.
James Victor Brown, 85, Australian rugby union player.
Gabriele Buschmeier, 65, German musicologist.
Tim Clark, 84, British physician.
Galyn Görg, 55, American actress (RoboCop 2, M.A.N.T.I.S., Point Break) and dancer, cancer.
Bea Gorton, 73, American college basketball coach (Indiana Hoosiers).
Polad Hashimov, 45, Azerbaijani military officer, shot.
Dinah Hinz, 86, German actress and voice actress.
Brian Hutton, Baron Hutton, 88, British jurist, Lord Chief Justice of Northern Ireland (1989–1997) and Lord of Appeal in Ordinary (1997–2004).
Muhammad Mohaiminul Islam, 78, Bangladeshi military officer, Chief of Naval Staff (1991–1995), COVID-19.
Ronald Johnson, 76, American politician, member of the Alabama House of Representatives (since 1978), liver cancer.
Jindřich Kabát, 67, Czech psychologist and politician, Minister of Culture (1992–1994).
Caesar Korolenko, 86, Russian psychiatrist, COVID-19.
Daniel Lewis Lee, 47, American white supremacist and convicted triple murderer, execution by lethal injection.
Dave Lewis, 65, American football player (Tampa Bay Buccaneers, San Diego Chargers, Los Angeles Rams).
J. J. Lionel, 72, Belgian musician ("La danse des canards").
Ron de Lugo, 89, American politician.
Maria Lugones, 76, Argentine feminist philosopher.
Noël Martin, 60, Jamaican-born British assisted suicide activist and neo-Nazi victim.
Alex McCool, 96, American NASA manager.
Luis Orán Castañeda, 41, Colombian racing cyclist, conveyor belt accident.
Susan Quimpo, 59, Filipino activist and author.
Sir Desmond Rice, 95, British army officer and courtier.
Maurice Roëves, 83, Scottish actor (Oh! What a Lovely War, Escape to Victory, The Last of the Mohicans).
Arthur Samberg, 79, American businessman, leukemia.
Abolghasem Sarhaddizadeh, 75, Iranian politician, Minister of Labour and Social Affairs (1983–1989) and MP (1990–1992, 1996–2004).
Milan Šašik, 67, Slovak-born Ukrainian Ruthenian Catholic hierarch, Bishop of Mukachevo (since 2002).
John Schaeffer, 79, Dutch-born Australian art collector and businessman, traffic collision.
Shajahan Siraj, 77, Bangladeshi politician, MP (1986–1991) and co-founder of Jatiya Samajtantrik Dal, cancer.
Noemi Steuer, 63, Swiss actress (Die Zweite Heimat).
Stephen Susman, 79, American attorney, COVID-19.
Juan Uder, 93, Argentine basketball player, world champion (1950).

15
Carlotta Barilli, 84, Italian actress (Ragazzi del Juke-Box, Howlers in the Dock, La commare secca).
Mateo A. T. Caparas, 96, Filipino lawyer and politician.
Severino Cavalcanti, 89, Brazilian politician, Deputy (1995–2005), complications from diabetes.
Igor Chernykh, 88, Russian cinematographer (The Diamond Arm, Particularly Important Task, Private Detective, or Operation Cooperation).
Elias Farkouh, 72, Jordanian novelist, heart attack.
Catherine Freeman, 88, British television producer.
Paul Fusco, 89, American photojournalist, dementia.
Juan José García Corral, 68, Spanish bullfighter.
Ivar Genesjö, 89, Swedish Olympic fencer (1964).
Louw de Graaf, 90, Dutch politician.
Sayed Haider, 95, Bangladeshi language movement activist, pneumonia.
Stan Hindman, 76, American football player (San Francisco 49ers).
David Humphries, 66, English cricketer (Leicestershire, Worcestershire).
David Kaiser, 50, American philanthropist, glioblastoma multiforme.
Arnol Kox, 67, Dutch street preacher.
Oscar Hugh Lipscomb, 88, American Roman Catholic prelate, Archbishop of Mobile (1980–2008).
Hem Lumphat, 43, Cambodian Olympic swimmer (1996).
Travell Mazion, 24, American boxer, NABF super welterweight champion, traffic collision.
Nancy McArthur, 88, American author.
Nigel Murch, 76, Australian cricketer (Victoria, Northamptonshire).
Kieran O'Connor, 41, Irish Gaelic footballer (Aghada, Cork), Ewing's sarcoma.
Enrico Perucconi, 95, Italian Olympic sprinter.
Ana Romero Reguera, 88, Spanish fighting bull rancher.
Eugenio Scarpellini, 66, Italian-born Bolivian Roman Catholic prelate, Auxiliary Bishop (2010–2013) and Bishop of El Alto (since 2013), COVID-19.
Tonia Shand, 80, Australian diplomat.
George Simon, 73, Guyanese artist and archeologist, cancer.
Sir Toke Talagi, 69, Niuean diplomat and politician, MP (1999–2020) and Premier (2008–2020).
Mohd. Khusairi Abdul Talib, 59, Malaysian politician, Perak State MLA (since 2004), heart attack.

16
David Bobihoe Akib, 64, Indonesian politician, Regent of Gorontalo (2005–2015).
Ken Chinn, 57, Canadian punk rock vocalist (SNFU).
Roger Côté, 80, Canadian ice hockey player (Edmonton Oilers, Indianapolis Racers).
Christopher Dickey, 68, American journalist, news editor (The Daily Beast) and author, heart attack.
Tony Elliott, 73, English publisher, founder of Time Out Group.
Patrick Ellis, 77, American radio host, complications from COVID-19.
Mason Gaffney, 96, American economist.
Marcus Gaither, 59, American-French basketball player.
Ted Gerela, 76, Canadian football player (BC Lions).
Mustapha Karkouti, 77, Syrian journalist, heart attack.
Karl Heinrich Kaufhold, 87, German historian.
Janis Kravis, 84, Latvian-born Canadian architect.
Marie-Christine Lévesque, 61–62, Canadian author, brain cancer.
Azuma Morisaki, 92, Japanese film director (Tora-san, His Tender Love, Time and Tide, Pecoross' Mother and Her Days), stroke.
Cornelius Mwalwanda, Malawian economist and politician, COVID-19.
Norm Neeson, 86, Australian footballer (North Melbourne).
Vladimir Obuchov, 84, Russian basketball coach (MBC Dynamo Moscow, Soviet Union national team, Malta national team).
Jamie Oldaker, 68, American drummer (Eric Clapton, The Tractors).
Omaswati, 54, Indonesian comedian.
Jonathan Oppenheim, 67, American film editor (Paris Is Burning, The Oath), brain cancer.
Elmer Pato, 66, Filipino taekwondo practitioner, COVID-19.
Wesley Ira Purkey, 68, American convicted murderer, execution by lethal injection.
Rick Reed, 70, American baseball umpire.
Neela Satyanarayanan, 72, Indian civil servant, COVID-19.
Phyllis Somerville, 76, American actress (The Big C, Little Children, The Curious Case of Benjamin Button). 
Tony Taylor, 84, Cuban baseball player (Chicago Cubs, Philadelphia Phillies, Detroit Tigers), complications from a stroke.
Frits Tellegen, 101, Dutch urban designer.
Alexei Tezikov, 42, Russian ice hockey player (Washington Capitals, Vancouver Canucks, HC Lada Togliatti), heart attack.
Víctor Víctor, 71, Dominican singer-songwriter and guitarist, COVID-19.
Horst Wenninger, 81-82, German physicist.
Delphine Zanga Tsogo, 84, Cameroonian writer, feminist and politician, Deputy (1965–1972).

17
Emajuddin Ahamed, 86, Bangladeshi political scientist and academic administrator, Vice-Chancellor of the University of Dhaka (1992–1996), cardiac arrest.
Ekaterina Alexandrovskaya, 20, Russian-Australian Olympic pair skater (2018), junior world champion (2017), suicide by jumping.
Gian Franco Anedda, 89, Italian politician, Deputy (1992–2006).
Moussa Benhamadi, 67, Algerian politician and executive, COVID-19.
Brigid Berlin, 80, American artist, pulmonary embolism.
Pierre-Marie Coty, 92, Ivorian Roman Catholic prelate, Bishop of Daloa (1975–2005).
Josephine Cox, 82, English author.
Alex Dawson, 80, Scottish footballer (Manchester United, Preston North End, Brighton & Hove Albion).
Seyfi Dursunoğlu, 87, Turkish comedian and television presenter (Dans Eder misin?), pneumonia.
Julian Farrand, 84, English legal academic, pulmonary embolism.
Peter Ford, 86, English footballer (Port Vale, Macclesfield Town, Stoke City).
Dominic Foreman, 86, Australian politician, Senator (1981–1997).
Zenon Grocholewski, 80, Polish Roman Catholic cardinal, Prefect of the Congregation for Catholic Education (1999–2015).
Derek Ho, 55, American surfer, world champion (1993), heart attack.
Barry Jarman, 84, Australian cricketer (South Australia, national team).
Zizi Jeanmaire, 96, French ballet dancer (Carmen).
John Lewis, 80, American civil rights leader and politician, member of the U.S. House of Representatives (since 1987), Presidential Medal of Freedom recipient (2011), pancreatic cancer.
Shirley Love, 87, American broadcaster (WOAY-TV) and politician, member of the West Virginia Senate (1994–2008) and House of Delegates (2017–2019).
Volodymyr Lozynskyi, 65, Ukrainian football player (Dynamo Kyiv) and manager (Vorskla Poltava).
Silvio Marzolini, 79, Argentine footballer (Ferro Carril Oeste, Boca Juniors, national team), complications from a stroke and cancer.
Daniel Ato Kwamina Mensah, 66, Ghanaian banker and economist, CEO of Ghana Association of Bankers.
John Neale, 93, English Anglican clergyman, Bishop of Ramsbury (1974–1988).
Angela von Nowakonski, 67, Brazilian physician, COVID-19.
Thomas O'Regan, 64, Australian media theorist and academic.
J. I. Packer, 93, British-born Canadian evangelical theologian (Knowing God).
Marcuse Pfeifer, 83, American gallerist.
Bill Scott, 74, British Anglican priest, Deputy Clerk of the Closet (2007–2015).
C. S. Seshadri, 88, Indian mathematician (Seshadri constant).
Michael Silverstein, 74, American linguist and anthropologist, brain cancer.
Andrzej Strzelecki, 68, Polish actor, satirist and screenplay writer, rector of Aleksander Zelwerowicz National Academy of Dramatic Art in Warsaw (2008–2016), lung cancer.
Ron Tauranac, 95, British-Australian engineer and racing car designer, co-founder of Brabham.
C. T. Vivian, 95, American author and civil rights activist, Presidential Medal of Freedom recipient (2013).
Marian Więckowski, 86, Polish racing cyclist, Tour de Pologne winner (1954, 1955, 1956).

18
Vishnu Raj Atreya, 75, Nepali writer and poet, gallbladder cancer.
Charles Bukeko, 58, Kenyan actor and comedian (The Captain of Nakara), COVID-19.
Elize Cawood, 68, South African actress (Dis ek, Anna), lung cancer.
Paul Cunningham, 82, American Nazarene minister and superintendent (1993–2009).
Ismail Ebrahim, 73, South African cricketer (Natal).
Sanjiv Sam Gambhir, 57, Indian-born American physician, cancer.
Ray Hannigan, 93, Canadian-born American ice hockey player (Toronto Maple Leafs).
Robert Hellenga, 78, American writer and academic.
Katherine B. Hoffman, 105, American chemist and academic administrator, COVID-19.
Ashraf Hossain, 79, Bangladeshi politician, MP (1991–1996, 2006–2008), cancer.
Lenzie Howell, 52, American basketball player (Red Giants, Cholet, Bourg-en-Bresse).
David Jisse, 74, French composer, cancer.
Myrzageldy Kemel, 71, Kazakhstani academic and politician, Deputy (1995–2004).
Paul Kiener, 74, American director and cinematographer. 
Hubert Kitchen, 91, Canadian politician, member of the Newfoundland and Labrador House of Assembly.
Moonyeenn Lee, 76, South African casting director, talent agent and producer, complications from COVID-19.
Boško Marinko, 81, Serbian Olympic wrestler (1968, 1972).
Juan Marsé, 87, Spanish novelist, journalist and screenwriter, renal failure.
Colin Mason, 93, Australian journalist, author and politician, Senator (1978–1987).
Maura McNiel, 99, American women's rights activist.
Ali Mirzaei, 91, Iranian weightlifter, Olympic bronze medalist (1952). 
Martha Mmola, South African politician, MP (2014–2019), COVID-19.
Haruma Miura, 30, Japanese actor (Koizora, Kimi ni Todoke, Attack on Titan) and singer, suicide by hanging.
David Romero Ellner, Honduran journalist, lawyer, politician and convicted rapist, COVID-19.
Jope Ruonansuu, 56, Finnish actor, musician and stand-up comedian (Jopet Show), esophageal cancer.
Jaybee Sebastian, 40, Filipino convicted kidnapper and carjacker, COVID-19.
Henrique Soares da Costa, 57, Brazilian Roman Catholic prelate, Bishop of Palmares (since 2014), COVID-19.
Manuel C. Sobreviñas, 96, Filipino Roman Catholic prelate, Bishop of Imus (1993–2001).
Keith Sonnier, 78, American sculptor and artist.
Baba Ibrahim Suma-Keita, 73, Sierra Leonean Olympic long-distance runner (1980, 1988).
Lucio Urtubia, 89, Spanish counterfeiter, robber and kidnapper (Anarchist Federation).
Alefoso Yalayalatabua, 43, Fijian rugby union player (Highlanders, Warriors, national team).

19
Sultan Hashim Ahmad al-Tai, 76, Iraqi military officer and convicted war criminal, Minister of Defence (1995–2003), heart attack.
Biri Biri, 72, Gambian footballer (Wallidan Banjul, Sevilla, national team).
Bruce G. Blair, 72, American nuclear security expert and scholar, stroke.
Oreste Casalini, 58, Italian sculptor and painter, lung cancer.
David Cliche, 68, Canadian politician.
Giulia Maria Crespi, 97, Italian non-profit executive and environmentalist, founder of Fondo Ambiente Italiano.
Sonia Darrin, 96, American actress (Bury Me Dead, Federal Agent at Large).
Doris Dartey, Ghanaian journalist, complications from cancer.
Seydou Diarra, 86, Ivorian politician, Prime Minister (2000, 2003–2005).
Louis Dicaire, 73, Canadian Roman Catholic prelate, Auxiliary Bishop of Montreal (1999–2004) and Saint-Jean-Longueuil (since 2004).
Sapardi Djoko Damono, 80, Indonesian poet, multiple organ failure.
Denise Domenach-Lallich, 95, French resistance member.
Cor Fuhler, 55, Dutch-Australian experimental musician.
Momoko Iko, 80, American playwright.
Mikołaj Kubica, 74, Polish Olympic gymnast (1964, 1968, 1972).
Jack McIlhargey, 68, Canadian ice hockey player and coach (Vancouver Canucks, Philadelphia Flyers, Hartford Whalers), cancer.
Lorenzo Milam, 86, American writer.
Joan Moriarty, 97, British military nurse, Matron-in-chief of Queen Alexandra's Royal Army Nursing Corps (1977–1981).
Giuseppe Ottaviani, 104, Italian masters athlete.
Vladimir Proskurin, 79, Soviet football player and coach.
Emitt Rhodes, 70, American singer-songwriter ("Live") and musician (The Palace Guard, The Merry-Go-Round).
Viktor Ryashko, 56, Ukrainian football player (Nyva Ternopil) and manager (Hoverla Uzhhorod), traffic collision.
István Séllyei, 70, Hungarian Olympic wrestler (1976).
Shanthamma, 95, Indian actress.
Shukrullo, 98, Uzbek poet.
Nikolai Tanayev, 74, Kyrgyz politician, Prime Minister (2002–2005).
Franciszek Ziejka, 79, Polish literary historian, rector of Jagiellonian University (1999–2005).

20
Muhammad Aslam, 73, Pakistani jurist, Justice of the Supreme Court (2009–2012) and Chief Justice of Islamabad High Court (2008–2009), COVID-19.
Hal Bernson, 89, American politician, member of the Los Angeles City Council (1979–2003).
Boka, 71, Azerbaijani singer.
Michael Brooks, 36, American political commentator (The Majority Report with Sam Seder), internal jugular vein thrombosis.
Victor Chizhikov, 84, Russian children's book illustrator, designer of Misha.
Saskia Cohen-Tanugi, 61, French theatre director.
Ross Dallow, 82, New Zealand police officer.
Lone Dybkjær, 80, Danish politician, Minister for the Environment (1988–1990), cancer.
Roy Den Hollander, 72, American lawyer and murderer, perpetrator of the Salas home shooting, suicide by gunshot.
Ismaila Isa Funtua, 78, Nigerian politician, cardiac arrest.
Mirja Jämes, 95, Finnish Olympic hurdler (1948).
Gunther Kaschlun, 85, German Olympic rower (1956).
Ruth Lewis, 74, Pakistani Roman Catholic nun, co-founder of Darul Sukun, COVID-19.
Robert "Bob" Martin, 71, American editor.
Salman Mazahiri, Indian Islamic scholar and chancellor of Mazahir Uloom, Saharanpur.
Bijay Mohanty, 70, Indian actor (Naga Phasa, Sahara Jaluchi).
Kenneth L. Peek Jr., 87, American lieutenant general.
Frazier Reams Jr., 90, American politician.
Doug Rogers, 79, Canadian judoka, Olympic silver medallist (1964).
Ram Awadhesh Singh, 83, Indian politician, MP (1977–1979, 1986–1992).
Mike Slemen, 69, English rugby union player (Liverpool, national team).
Harry Smith, 85, Canadian ice hockey player.
Günter-Helge Strickstrack, 99, German politician, founding member of the CDU. 
Shane Tuck, 38, Australian footballer (Richmond), suicide.
Jorge Villavicencio, 62, Guatemalan surgeon, Minister of Public Health and Social Assistance (2012–2014), COVID-19.
Geoff Williams, 89, Australian footballer (Geelong).

21
François Amoudruz, 93, French resistance member and Holocaust survivor.
Jos Bax, 74, Dutch footballer (FC Eindhoven, Helmond Sport, VVV-Venlo).
Jean-Noël de Bouillane de Lacoste, 85, French ambassador and diplomat.
Dobby Dobson, 78, Jamaican reggae singer and record producer, COVID-19.
Eva Lois Evans, 85, American educator.
Cheikh Sadibou Fall, 69, Senegalese politician, Minister of the Interior (2004).
Suka K. Frederiksen, 55, Greenlandic politician, Foreign Minister (2017–2018).
Mieko Hirota, 73, Japanese singer, heart failure.
Dean Ing, 89, American author.
Alice Koller, 94, American author and academic.
Li Jijun, 87, Chinese geographer and geomorphologist.
Margaret McIver, 86, Australian Olympic equestrian (1984).
Hugh McLaughlin, 75, Scottish footballer (St Mirren, Third Lanark, Queen of the South).
Bruce McPhail, 83, New Zealand rugby union player (Canterbury, Nelson, national team). 
Andrew Mlangeni, 95, South African political activist (Rivonia Trial).
Lennox Napier, 92, British major general.
Sean O'Mahony, 88, British music writer and magazine editor (The Beatles Book, Record Collector).
Stanley Robinson, 32, American basketball player (Iowa Energy, Moncton Miracles, Reales de La Vega).
Francisco Rodríguez Adrados, 98, Spanish Hellenist, translator and linguist, member of the Royal Spanish Academy.
Annie Ross, 89, British-American jazz singer (Lambert, Hendricks & Ross), songwriter ("Twisted"), and actress (Superman III), complications from emphysema and heart disease.
Michelle Senlis, 87, French songwriter and lyricist.
Susan Sizemore, 69, American novelist.
Tim Smith, 59, English singer-songwriter (Cardiacs, The Sea Nymphs, Spratleys Japs).
Wouter Snijders, 92, Dutch judge and legal scholar, Justice (1970–1986) and Vice President (1986–1998) of the Supreme Court.
Lalji Tandon, 85, Indian politician, Governor of Bihar (2018–2019) and Madhya Pradesh (2019–2020).
Halldóra K. Thoroddsen, 70, Icelandic writer.
Bob Wallace, 69, Australian-born American runner.
Kansai Yamamoto, 76, Japanese fashion designer, acute myeloid leukemia.

22
John Boyagis, 92, British Olympic alpine skier (1948, 1952).
Jim Carruthers, 79, American politician.
Zacharias Chaliabalias, 74, Greek footballer (Iraklis, national team).
*Dino De Poli, 90, Italian lawyer and politician, Deputy (1968–1972).
Charles Dewachtere, 92, Belgian Olympic marathon runner (1952).
Theo Diergaardt, 50, Namibian politician.
Eulogius, 83, Russian Orthodox prelate, Metropolitan of Vladimir and Suzdal (1990–2018).
Charles Evers, 97, American civil rights activist, disc jockey and politician, mayor of Fayette, Mississippi (1969–1981, 1985–1989).
Joan Feynman, 93, American astrophysicist.
Richard Fielder, 95, American television writer (Marcus Welby, M.D., Gunsmoke, The Waltons).
Dirk Geukens, 57, Belgian motocross racer (1990 and 1991 Motocross World Championship medalist).
Alexander Gusev, 73, Russian ice hockey player, Olympic champion (1976).
Carlton Haselrig, 54, American wrestler, football player (Pittsburgh Steelers, New York Jets) and mixed martial artist, NCAA Wrestling Division I and II champion (1987–1989).
Aleksandr Ivanitsky, 82, Russian wrestler, Olympic champion (1964).
Ralph Liguori, 93, American racing driver (NASCAR Cup Series, USAC Championship Car series).
Tom Mitchell, 88, Irish republican and politician, MP (1955).
Raoul Sarrazin, 81, Canadian Olympic boxer (1960).
Bob Sebra, 58, American baseball player (Montreal Expos, Philadelphia Phillies, Cincinnati Reds), multiple organ failure.
Chito Soganub, 59, Filipino Roman Catholic priest and kidnap victim, cardiac arrest.
Tony Turner, 90, English archdeacon.
Luzius Wildhaber, 83, Swiss jurist, President of the European Court of Human Rights (1998–2007).

23
Mike Adams, 55, American columnist (The Daily Wire) and professor (University of North Carolina Wilmington), suicide by gunshot.
Lamine Bechichi, 92, Algerian politician.
John Blake, 59, American football player and coach (Oklahoma Sooners), heart attack.
Dick Bond, 84, American politician, member of the Kansas Senate (1987–2001).
John Bradbury, 79, Australian footballer (Footscray).
Jean Brankart, 90, Belgian racing cyclist.
Hassan Brijany, 59, Swedish actor, COVID-19.
Éric de Cromières, 66, French sporting (ASM Clermont Auvergne) and tire executive (Michelin), cancer.
Emmanuel Farhi, 41, French economist.
Jerome Farris, 90, American jurist, Judge of the U.S. Court of Appeals for the Ninth Circuit (since 1979).
Alan Garner, 69, English footballer (Luton Town, Watford, Millwall).
Noel Jenke, 73, American football player (Minnesota Vikings, Atlanta Falcons, Green Bay Packers).
Tomas Joson III, 72, Filipino politician, Governor of Nueva Ecija (1992–1995, 1998–2007).
Ove König, 70, Swedish Olympic speed skater (1972).
Masakazu Konishi, 87, Japanese neurobiologist.
Jacqueline Noonan, 91, American pediatric cardiologist.
Ward Plummer, 79, American physicist.
Leida Rammo, 96, Estonian actress (A Young Retiree, The Fencer) and theatre director.
Sérgio Ricardo, 88, Brazilian film director (The Night of the Scarecrow), composer (Black God, White Devil) and singer, heart failure.
Bohuslav Rylich, 86, Czech Olympic basketball player.
José Said, 90, Chilean real estate developer, founder chairman of Parque Arauco S.A. (since 1979).
Paolo Sassone-Corsi, 64, Italian molecular biologist (French National Centre for Scientific Research, University of California, Irvine).
Jacqueline Scott, 89, American actress (Macabre, Duel, The Fugitive), lung cancer.
Betti Sheldon, 85, American politician.
Dominic Sonic, 55, French singer.
Jerry Taft, 77, American meteorologist (WLS-TV, WMAQ-TV).
Ludmila Vachtová, 86, Czech historian and art critic.
Geoffrey Walton, 86, British Anglican priest, Archdeacon of Dorset (1982–2000).
Stuart Wheeler, 85, British financier and political activist, founder of IG Group and Treasurer of UKIP (2011–2014), stomach cancer.
Paulette Wilson, 64, Jamaican-British human rights activist.

24
Nina Andreyeva, 81, Russian chemist and politician, General Secretary of the All-Union Communist Party of Bolsheviks (since 1991).
Claude Beausoleil, 71, Canadian writer and poet.
Bo Black, 74, American festival director (Summerfest) and Playboy cover girl.
Richard Brettell, 71, American art historian and museum curator, cancer.
Ondřej Buchtela, 20, Czech ice hockey player (Piráti Chomutov, HC Benátky nad Jizerou), heart cancer.
Humbert Camerlo, 76, French opera director (Bluebeard's Castle, The Gypsy Baron).
Rene Carpenter, 92, American columnist and television personality, heart failure.
Roberto Draghetti, 59, Italian voice actor, heart attack.
H. George Frederickson, 86, American academic.
Jean-Marc Gabaude, 92, French philosopher.
Ray Grant, 86, Canadian curler.
Malcolm Green, 84, British inorganic chemist.
David Hagen, 47, Scottish footballer (Falkirk, Clyde, Peterhead), motor neuron disease.
James Hughes Hancock, 89, American jurist, Judge of the U.S. District Court for Northern Alabama (since 1973).
Delwar Hossain, 85–86, Bangladeshi politician.
Ben Jipcho, 77, Kenyan athlete, Olympic silver medallist (1972).
Denise Idris Jones, 69, Welsh politician.
Nejib Ben Khalfallah, 52–53, Tunisian dancer and choreographer.
Nicolai Lomov, 74, Russian-born American pianist.
John Machacek, 80, American journalist (The Times-Union).
Claude-Gérard Marcus, 86, French politician, MP (1968–1997).
Benjamin Mkapa, 81, Tanzanian politician, President (1995–2005), heart attack as a complication of malaria.
Bernard Mohlalisi, 87, Lesothan Roman Catholic prelate, Archbishop of Maseru (1990–2009).
Cristal Nell, 42, American bridge player.
Kundi Paihama, 75, Angolan politician, MP (since 2018).
Regis Philbin, 88, American entertainer and television personality (The Joey Bishop Show, Live with Regis and Kathie Lee, Who Wants to Be a Millionaire), heart attack.
Naazim Richardson, 55, American boxing trainer.
Lotty Rosenfeld, 77, Chilean artist.
Amala Shankar, 101, Indian dancer and actress (Kalpana).
Barry St. John, 77, Scottish singer ("Come Away Melinda").
Ann Syrdal, 74, American psychologist and computer science researcher, developed the first female-sounding voice synthesizer.
Jan Verroken, 103, Belgian politician (Chamber of Representatives, Flemish Parliament, European Parliament), mayor of Oudenaarde (1983–1988).
Zheng Shouren, 80, Chinese engineer, chief designer of the Three Gorges Dam.
Claudio Zupo, 35, Mexican judoka, COVID-19.

25
Azimzhan Askarov, 69, Kyrgyz journalist and human rights activist, pneumonia.
Charlie Balducci, 44, American reality TV personality (True Life).
Božena Böhmová, 95, Czech actress (Žena za pultem).
Jean Boin, 71, French footballer (Reims, Lens).
Peter Bowler, 86, Australian lexicographer.
Roger Buckley, 82–83, American academic.
Angelo Carossino, 91, Italian politician, MEP (1979–1989) and President of Liguria (1975–1979).
Mogens Christensen, 90, Norwegian Olympic luger (1964).
Steve dePyssler, 101, American Air Force colonel, COVID-19.
Jim Frick, 68, Swedish horse harness racer.
Peter Green, 73, English Hall of Fame blues rock singer-songwriter ("Black Magic Woman") and guitarist (Fleetwood Mac, Peter Green Splinter Group).
Lou Henson, 88, American Hall of Fame college basketball coach (Hardin-Simmons, New Mexico State, Illinois) and administrator, non-Hodgkin lymphoma.
Flor Isava Fonseca, 99, Venezuelan journalist and sports executive. 
Lady Red Couture, 43, American drag queen, complications of cyclic vomiting syndrome. 
Bernard Ładysz, 98, Polish opera singer and actor (The Doll, The Quack, Pierścień i róża).
CP Lee, 70, English musician (Alberto y Lost Trios Paranoias).
Giulio Maceratini, 82, Italian politician, MEP (1988).
Thomas J. McCormick, 87, American historian.
José Mentor, 71, Brazilian lawyer and politician, Deputy (2003–2019), COVID-19.
Maurice Petty, 81, American Hall of Fame racing driver, crew chief and engine builder.
Pauline Pirok, 93, American baseball player (Kenosha Comets, South Bend Blue Sox).
Turíbio Ruiz, 90, Brazilian actor, voice actor, television and radio presenter, stroke.
John Saxon, 83, American actor (A Nightmare on Elm Street, Enter the Dragon, Joe Kidd), pneumonia.
Eddie Shack, 83, Canadian ice hockey player (Toronto Maple Leafs, New York Rangers, Pittsburgh Penguins), four-time Stanley Cup winner (1962–1964, 1967), cancer.
Janell Smith, 73, American Olympic sprinter (1964), cancer.
Soe Win, 59, Burmese bodyguard (Aung San Suu Kyi), heart disease.
Luciano Fabio Stirati, 97, Italian politician, Senator (1963–1968, 1972–1976).
Richard L. Weldon, 87, Canadian politician.
Helen Jones Woods, 96, American trombonist, COVID-19.

26
Jim Abbott, 77, Canadian politician, MP (1993–2011).
Edmund Ansin, 84, American television executive, co-founder of Sunbeam Television.
Rafael Barraza Sánchez, 91, Mexican Roman Catholic prelate, Bishop of Mazatlán (1981–2005).
R. Stephen Berry, 89, American physical chemist.
Alain Cacheux, 72, French politician, heart attack.
Brian Chewter, 66, Canadian Olympic cyclist (1972, 1976).
Tereza Costa Rêgo, 91, Brazilian painter, stroke.
Dame Olivia de Havilland, 104, French-British-American actress (Gone with the Wind, The Adventures of Robin Hood, To Each His Own), Oscar winner (1947, 1950).
Bill English, 91, American computer engineer, co-developer of the computer mouse, respiratory failure.
Alison Fiske, 76, English actress (For Services Rendered), cancer.
Francisco Frutos, 80, Spanish politician, General Secretary of the Communist Party of Spain (1998–2009), cancer.
Claudia Giannotti, 83, Italian actress (Il Prof. Dott. Guido Tersilli, primario della clinica Villa Celeste, convenzionata con le mutue).
Guy Lutgen, 84, Belgian politician, Minister of Agriculture in the Walloon Government (1988–1999), mayor of Bastogne (1976–2000) and Senator (1977–1995).
Chris Needs, 66, Welsh radio broadcaster (BBC Radio Cymru), heart condition.
Alireza Raheb, 53, Iranian poet, songwriter and literary critic, COVID-19.
Lluís Serrahima, 88, Spanish writer, co-creator of Nova Cançó.
Robert Smith, 55, Canadian actor. (body discovered on this date)
Anne K. Stokowski, 94, American politician, member of the Minnesota Senate (1979–1982).
Hans-Jochen Vogel, 94, German politician, Minister of Justice (1974–1981), Leader of the SPD (1987–1991), complications from Parkinson's disease.
John Weeks, 79, American economist.
Roger Williams, 88, British hepatologist.
Willie Young, 77, American football player (New York Giants).

27
Israfil Alam, 54, Bangladeshi politician, MP (since 2009), complications from COVID-19.
Owen Arthur, 70, Barbadian politician, Prime Minister (1994–2008), heart failure.
Carol Brock, 96, American food critic, respiratory failure.
Felicia F. Campbell, 89, American academic, COVID-19.
Lars-Göran Carlsson, 71, Swedish Olympic sports shooter (1980).
Kathy Charmaz, 80, American sociologist, cancer.
AKM Amanul Islam Chowdhury, 83, Bangladeshi political advisor, COVID-19.
Bernard Cleary, 83, Canadian politician, MP (2004–2006).
Vic Ekberg, 88, Australian Olympic ice hockey player.
Frank Guilford, 92, American politician.
Sir John Guinness, 84, British civil servant and businessman.
William Hill, 75, Hong Kong Olympic sprinter (1964).
Frank Howard, 81, American politician, member of the Louisiana House of Representatives (2008–2020), complications from COVID-19.
Radhi Jazi, 92, Tunisian pharmacist.
Kina Kadreva, 88, Bulgarian children's book writer.
Magda Kósáné Kovács, 79, Hungarian politician, MEP (2004–2009).
Muhammad Asad Malik, 78, Pakistani field hockey player, Olympic champion (1968), traffic collision.
Jan Skopeček, 94, Czech actor (Hroch, Tam, kde hnízdí čápi) and playwright.
Khalil Taha, 88, Lebanese wrestler, Olympic bronze medallist (1952).
Gianrico Tedeschi, 100, Italian actor (Susanna Whipped Cream, Il merlo maschio, Dr. Jekyll Likes Them Hot).
Terry Waters, 76, Australian footballer (Collingwood), cancer.

28
Aleksandr Aksinin, 65, Russian athlete, Olympic champion (1980).
Daphne Athas, 96, American author.
Junrey Balawing, 27, Filipino record holder, world's shortest man (since 2015).
Roland Boullanger, 81, French Olympic swimmer (1960).
Eugénio Eleutério, 99, Portuguese Olympic runner (1952).
Bent Fabric, 95, Danish pianist and composer ("Alley Cat").
Mo Gaba, 14, American sports radio personality, cancer.
José Luis García Ferrero, 90, Spanish veterinarian and politician, Minister of Agriculture, Fisheries and Food (1982).
Gisèle Halimi, 93, Tunisian-French lawyer and feminist.
Gerry Harris, 84, English footballer (Wolverhampton Wanderers).
Kurt Hennrich, 88, Czech Olympic alpine skier (1956).
Gísli Rúnar Jónsson, 67, Icelandic actor.
Kul Bahadur Khadka, 69, Nepali military officer, Acting Chief of Army Staff (2009), pancreatic cancer.
Jerzy Konieczny, 69, Polish lawyer and civil servant, chief of UOP (1992–1993), Minister of the Interior (1995–1996).
Martin Konings, 91, Dutch politician, MP (1973–1986).
Kumkum, 86, Indian actress (Ganga Maiyya Tohe Piyari Chadhaibo, Mr. X in Bombay, Gunah Aur Kanoon).
Herbert Leuninger, 87, German Catholic priest, theologian and human rights activist (Pro Asyl).
Sir Bruce Liddington, 70, British headteacher.
Sydney Lotterby, 93, British television producer (Last of the Summer Wine, Yes Minister, Open All Hours).
John Loxley, 77, English-born Canadian economist.
Mohamed Mashally, Egyptian physician.
Masango Matambanadzo, 56, Zimbabwean politician, MP (since 2013).
John McNamara, 88, American baseball manager (San Diego Padres, Cincinnati Reds, Boston Red Sox).
Nicholas Micozzie, 89, American politician, member of the Pennsylvania House of Representatives (1979–2014).
Joseph Moingt, 104, French Jesuit priest.
Bill Montgomery, 80, American political activist, co-founder of Turning Point USA, COVID-19.
Paul Morin, 96, French politician, mayor of Bourg-en-Bresse (1989–1995).
Marcel Plasman, 95, Belgian politician, pneumonia.
Irene Pollin, 96, American sports executive and philanthropist, co-owner of the Washington Capitals and the Washington Wizards.
Clive Ponting, 74, British civil servant and historian.
Donald Prell, 96, American venture capitalist and futurist.
Raavi Kondala Rao, 88, Indian actor (Ramudu Bheemudu, Preminchi Choodu, Jeevitha Chakram), cardiac arrest.
Diana E. H. Russell, 81, South African feminist activist and writer.
Reese Schonfeld, 88, American television executive, president of CNN (1980–1982) and founder of Food Network.
Anna Simková, 89, Slovak stage actress.

29
Salko Bukvarević, 53, Bosnian politician, complications from COVID-19.
Albin Chalandon, 100, French politician, Minister of Justice (1986–1988).
Connie Culp, 57, American face transplant recipient, complications from an infection.
Ayo Fasanmi, 94, Nigerian politician, MP (since 1983).
Anatoli Fedyukin, 68, Russian handball player, Olympic champion (1976).
Mike Gillespie, 80, American baseball player and coach (USC Trojans, national team), complications from a stroke.
Dave Gray, 77, American baseball player (Boston Red Sox).
Oz Griebel, 71, American banker and lawyer, traffic collision.
Andy Haden, 69, New Zealand rugby union player (Auckland, national team), chronic lymphocytic leukaemia.
Sheikh Md. Nurul Haque, 79, Bangladeshi politician, MP (1991–2001, 2014–2019), COVID-19.
Michio Kinugasa, Japanese composer (Utawarerumono, Living for the Day After Tomorrow).
Joe Kernan, 74, American politician, Governor (2003–2005) and Lieutenant Governor (1997–2003) of Indiana, mayor of South Bend (1988–1997), complications from Alzheimer's disease.
Harold D. Langley, 95, American naval historian.
Dave Mackay, 88, American jazz pianist.
Malik B., 47, American rapper (The Roots).
Bob McCurdy, 68, American basketball player (Richmond Spiders), anal cancer.
Mark V. Meierhenry, 75, American lawyer, Attorney General of South Dakota (1979–1987).
Hernán Pinto, 67, Chilean politician, mayor of Valparaíso (1990–1992, 1992–2004), COVID-19.
André Ptaszynski, 67, British theatre producer.
David Ramsay, 72, Australian-born Canadian politician, Ontario MPP (1985–2011).
Ajip Rosidi, 82, Indonesian writer and poet.
Perrance Shiri, 65, Zimbabwean military officer and politician, Minister of Agriculture (since 2017) and Commander of the Air Force (1992–2017), COVID-19.
Giorgio Todde, 68, Italian writer.
R. Toros, 85, Syrian-born French sculptor.
Don Townsend, 89, English footballer (Charlton Athletic, Crystal Palace).
Bob Wilson, 86, Canadian ice hockey player (Chicago Blackhawks).

30
Randy Barlow, 77, American country singer, cancer.
Karen Berg, 77, American author, co-founder of the Kabbalah Centre.
Maarten Biesheuvel, 81, Dutch writer.
Herman Cain, 74, American food executive (Godfather's Pizza, Pillsbury Company) and politician, chair of the Federal Reserve Bank of Kansas City (1995–1996), complications of COVID-19.
Bob Dearing, 85, American politician, member of the Mississippi State Senate (1980–2012, 2016–2019).
Pino Grioni, 88, Italian painter, sculptor and ceramist.
Leslie Iversen, 82, British pharmacologist.
Amy Kaplan, 66, American academic and author, glioblastoma.
Lee Teng-hui, 97, Taiwanese politician, President (1988–2000), Vice President (1984–1988) and mayor of Taipei (1978–1981), multiple organ failure.
Somen Mitra, 78, Indian politician, MP (2009–2014) and West Bengal MLA (1972–1977, 1982–2009), multiple organ failure.
Anil Murali, 56, Indian actor (Nakshatratharattu, Ivar), liver disease.
Ashoke Mustafi, 86, Indian cricketer (Bengal).
Alan Petherbridge, 92, British Olympic judoka (1964).
Juan Ramón, 80, Argentine singer and actor, complications from pneumonia.
Mark Rocco, 69, English professional wrestler (ASW, IWE, NJPW).
Lionel Rocheman, 92, French actor, musician, and writer (I Don't Know Much, But I'll Say Everything, Red Kiss).
Noel Rose, 92, American immunologist, stroke.
Helen Sanger, 96, American librarian.
Jorge Santibáñez Ceardi, 86, Chilean politician, mayor of Viña del Mar (1994–1996) and Deputy (1965–1973).
Toshimitsu Tanaka, 90, Japanese composer, lung cancer.
Sonam Tshering Lepcha, 92, Indian folk musician.
Michael Yama, 76, American actor (G.I. Joe: A Real American Hero, Dumb and Dumber To, Dead Rising).
Robert Zink, 91, American mathematician.

31 
Robert John Audley, 91, British psychologist.
Dominique Aulanier, 46, French footballer (Saint-Étienne, Nice).
Martin Barner, 99, German mathematician.
Mike Clark, 73, American film critic (USA Today), injuries sustained from a fall.
André Darrieussecq, 93, French rugby union player (Biarritz Olympique, national team).
Maria Friesenhausen, 88, German soprano and academic teacher.
Mike Gale, 70, American basketball player (Kentucky Colonels, New York Nets, Portland Trail Blazers).
Sa. Kandasamy, 80, Indian novelist and filmmaker, heart attack.
Jocelyne Khoueiry, 64, Lebanese militant and activist.
Gary Knopp, 63, American politician, member of the Alaska House of Representatives (since 2017), plane collision.
Gilles Lapouge, 96, French writer and journalist.
Giulio Lazzarini, 93, Italian politician, mayor of Lucca (1994–1998).
Eusebio Leal, 77, Cuban historian (Old Havana).
Hans Ljungberg, 72, Swedish Olympic swimmer.
Bill Mack, 88, American country music disc jockey (WBAP), songwriter ("Blue", "Drinking Champagne"), Grammy winner (1997), and radio host, COVID-19.
Sir Alan Parker, 76, English film director (Midnight Express, Pink Floyd – The Wall, Mississippi Burning), BAFTA winner (1977, 1979, 1992).
Zamuxolo Peter, 55, South African politician, MP (since 2019), COVID-19.
Tamás Pomucz, 63, Hungarian Olympic sailor (1992).
R. D. Pradhan, 92, Indian civil servant.
David Gwilym Morris Roberts, 95, British civil engineer.
Wim Scherpenhuijsen Rom, 87, Dutch banker, founder of ING.
Yury Savenko, 59, Russian politician, Mayor of Kaliningrad (1998–2007).
Stephen Tataw, 57, Cameroonian footballer (Tonnerre Yaoundé, Olympic Mvolyé, national team).
Bert Thiel, 94, American baseball player (Boston Braves).
Joan Mari Torrealdai, 77, Spanish writer and journalist, cancer.
Guy Verhoeven, 82, Belgian Olympic hockey player (1964).
Ruth Weiss, 92, American poet, complications from a series of strokes.
Musa Yerniyazov, 72, Uzbek politician, complications from COVID-19.
Miodrag Živković, 92, Serbian sculptor.

References

2020-07
 07